Nina Daniels (born 22 June 1982, in Dunedin, New Zealand) is a New Zealand synchronised swimming competitor. She won a bronze medal with her sister Lisa Daniels in the Duet at the 2006 Commonwealth Games.

She competed at the 2008 Summer Olympics.

References

1982 births
Living people
New Zealand synchronised swimmers
Synchronized swimmers at the 2008 Summer Olympics
Olympic synchronised swimmers of New Zealand
Commonwealth Games bronze medallists for New Zealand
Synchronised swimmers at the 2006 Commonwealth Games
Commonwealth Games medallists in synchronised swimming
Swimmers from Dunedin
20th-century New Zealand women
21st-century New Zealand women
Medallists at the 2006 Commonwealth Games